"Shellshock" is a single released by British group New Order on 17 March 1986. The song originally appeared on the soundtrack to the movie Pretty in Pink one month prior to its single release. Production is credited to New Order and John Robie, and is loosely inspired by the 1983 Robie-produced R&B club hit, "One More Shot"—a studio project where Robie performed under the band name, C-Bank, and featuring vocals by Jenny Burton.

The single had differing B-sides; in the UK (catalogue number: FAC 143) the 7-inch came with the recycled "Thieves Like Us" instrumental, which also turned up in the movie Pretty in Pink (although not on the soundtrack), while the 12-inch had a dub mix titled "Shellcock". The US release had the also previously released instrumental version of "Thieves Like Us", which had appeared on the "Murder" 12-inch single on Factory Benelux.

"Shellshock" was an international hit, making the mainstream chart in the UK, Ireland, Australia and New Zealand.

The 12-inch boasts an extended remix of the song running nearly ten minutes, New Order's longest single not based on a track from one of their studio albums (discounting remixes of legacy songs) behind the 22.5-minute uncut release of "Video 5 8 6". For the release of the popular singles compilation Substance, the original Pretty in Pink soundtrack version was not used, as is widely believed, but an edited version of the 12-inch remix cut down to six-and-a-half minutes, omitting an entire verse of vocals. It is this version that appears most often on CD. The 9:41 single remix does not appear on any subsequent New Order compilations, however it surfaced on CD and digital download in 2011 on Volume 6 of the Blank & Jones Soeighties compilation series, titled "Extended Version".

Artwork
The cover artwork on the 12-inch single is by English photographer Geoff Power, taken in Florence, Italy, and is unique in that the word 'Alex' at the top of the cover (part of the found graffiti) was not added by Peter Saville, the designer who was fastidious about typography.

Track listing

Chart positions

References

New Order (band) songs
1986 singles
1985 songs
Songs written by Bernard Sumner
Songs written by Peter Hook
Songs written by Stephen Morris (musician)
Songs written by Gillian Gilbert
Songs written by John Robie
Factory Records singles
UK Independent Singles Chart number-one singles